Popești is a commune in Iași County, Western Moldavia, Romania. It is composed of six villages: Doroșcani, Hărpășești, Obrijeni, Pădureni, Popești and Vama.

References

Communes in Iași County
Localities in Western Moldavia